Cook Street Village is a shopping district in Victoria, British Columbia. There is an abundance of cafes, restaurants, pubs, and numerous boutique grocery shops.

References

Culture of Victoria, British Columbia
Tourist attractions in Victoria, British Columbia
Shopping districts and streets in Canada